Karla Šlechtová (born 22 May 1977) is a Czech politician and economist who served as Minister of Defence from December 2017 to June 2018. Previously, she also served as Minister of Regional Development from 2014 to 2017. Šlechtová has also been Member of the Chamber of Deputies (MP) since October 2017.

In March 2017, she became the first active politician in the Czech Republic to come out as lesbian.

References 

1977 births
People from Karlovy Vary
Living people
ANO 2011 Government ministers
University of West Bohemia alumni
Female defence ministers
Defence ministers of the Czech Republic
Regional Development ministers of the Czech Republic
Members of the Chamber of Deputies of the Czech Republic (2017–2021)
Women government ministers of the Czech Republic
LGBT legislators
LGBT government ministers
Czech LGBT politicians
Czech lesbians
Lesbian politicians